The Lansdowne Cup is a rugby union trophy competed for by Australia and Ireland. Established in 1999, the cup was donated to the Australian Rugby Union by the Lansdowne Club of Sydney. The cup was launched in advance of the two Test matches played during the 1999 Ireland rugby union tour of Australia. The crystal trophy, made by Ireland's Waterford Crystal, for which the two nations compete was unveiled at a pub in Brisbane on 9 June 1999. Australia have won the Cup eight times while Ireland have won on six occasions.

History
The inaugural contest for the Lansdowne Cup was a two-Test series played between Australia and Ireland in 1999, during the Irish tour of Australia.
Ireland are the current holders of the trophy following their 2022 autumn internationals victory.

Matches

Results
 – Summer Test
 – Autumn International

See also

 History of rugby union matches between Australia and Ireland

References

External links

Rugby union international rivalry trophies
History of rugby union matches between Australia and Ireland
International rugby union competitions hosted by Australia
International rugby union competitions hosted by Ireland
1999 establishments in Australia
1999 establishments in Ireland